This is a list of episodes for the fifth  season of the television series, Fast N' Loud.

Episodes

References 

2014 American television seasons